Chen Bo (Chinese: 陈博; born 4 August 1989 in Wuhan) is a Chinese football player who currently plays for China League Two side Guangxi Pingguo Haliao.

Club career
In 2011, Chen Bo started his professional footballer career with Chengdu Tiancheng in the Chinese Super League. He would eventually make his league debut for Chengdu on 6 July 2011 in a game against Guangzhou Evergrande, coming on as a substitute for Peng Xinli in the 85th minute.
In March 2015, Chen transferred to China League Two side Yinchuan Helanshan.

On 24 January 2019, Chen transferred to fellow League Two side Qingdao Jonoon.

Career statistics 

Statistics accurate as of match played 31 December 2020.

References

External links
Chen Bo at Soccerway.com

1989 births
Living people
Chinese footballers
Footballers from Wuhan
Chengdu Tiancheng F.C. players
Qingdao Hainiu F.C. (1990) players
Chinese Super League players
China League One players
Association football defenders
Guangxi Pingguo Haliao F.C. players
21st-century Chinese people